Shenwan is a town situated at the southwest periphery of the city of Zhongshan, Guangdong province. The population of Shenwan is  residents.

The town is noted for its pineapples, which can be seen on sale by many street vendors.

See also
Shatian dialect

External links
Shenwan Government Website

Zhongshan
Township-level divisions of Guangdong